Dreams: The Ultimate Corrs Collection is the second greatest hits album by Irish band The Corrs, released on 20 November 2006, comprising hits, traditional ballads and previously unreleased songs.

Track listing

Personnel 

David Boucher – engineer, mixing
Stuart Bruce – arranger, producer
Michael Buckley – saxophone
Matt Chamberlain – drums
Bob Clearmountain – mixing
Andrea Corr – lead vocals, tin whistle
Caroline Corr – percussion, drums, piano, vocals, bodhran
Jim Corr – guitar, piano, keyboards, vocals, producer
Sharon Corr – violin, vocals
The Corrs – producer
Jorgin Dahl – producer
Ronan Dooney – piccolo trumpet
Anthony Drennan – lead guitar, mandolin
Jason Duffy – drums
Keith Duffy – bass guitar
Franck Eultry – keyboards, programming
David Foster – producer
Mitchell Froom – producer
Matt Furnidge – mixing
Paul Gaster – sleeve photo
Hans Grottheim – producer, remixing
John Hughes – management
K-Klass – remixing, reproduction
Kieran Kiely – accordion
Robert John "Mutt" Lange – producer
Oliver Leiber – producer
Richard Lowe – remixing
Steve MacMillan – mixing
Tim Martin – engineer
Brian Masterson – mixing
John McSherry – uilleann pipes, low whistle
Paul Meehan – keyboards, programming, producer
Paddy Moloney – producer, mixing
Andrew Murray – sleeve photo
Adam Phillips – guitar
Peter Rafelson – producer
Brian Rawling – producer
James Reynolds – mixing
Olle Romo – producer
Mike Shipley – mixing
Tim Summerhayes – engineer
Todd Terry – producer, remixing
Tin Tin Out – producer, remixing
Laurent Voulzy – guitar, vocals

Charts and certifications

Charts

Certifications

References

The Corrs albums
2006 greatest hits albums
2006 live albums
Atlantic Records compilation albums
Albums produced by Brian Rawling